Stephen Edward Schmidt (born September 28, 1970) is an American political and corporate strategist, media commentator and founder of The Warning. He is known for working on Republican political campaigns, including those of President George W. Bush, California Governor Arnold Schwarzenegger, and Arizona Senator John McCain during his 2008 presidential campaign.

He was a vice chair at the public relations firm Edelman, where he advised CEOs and senior decision makers at Fortune 500 corporations, until he stepped down July 2018. He became a political analyst for MSNBC in 2011, and appeared on the third season of Showtime's The Circus.

Schmidt has been extremely critical of former President Donald Trump, and of the GOP for supporting him. In June 2018, Schmidt renounced the Republican Party as "fully the party of Trump". In early December 2020, he stated: "The Republican Party is an organized conspiracy for the purposes of maintaining power for self-interest, and the self-interest of its donor class ... It's no longer dedicated to American democracy."

Schmidt is a founder of The Lincoln Project, a group founded to campaign against former President Trump. He resigned from the board in 2021 in the wake of the John Weaver sexual harassment scandal, claiming that he had only learned of the allegations in the previous month, though this claim was contradicted by a former Lincoln Project employee.

In a podcast on December 14, 2020, Schmidt announced that he planned to register as a member of the Democratic Party.

Early life and education 
The son of a schoolteacher and a telecommunications executive, Schmidt grew up in North Plainfield, New Jersey, where he became an Eagle Scout, a tight end on the high school football team, a two-year member of the National Honor Society, and senior class vice president. In 1988, he was one of two graduating seniors voted "most likely to succeed" by his classmates at North Plainfield High School. As a young boy, he distributed campaign materials for Democrat Bill Bradley's 1978 United States Senate election in New Jersey.

Schmidt attended the University of Delaware from 1988 through the spring of 1993, majoring in political science. During this time, he registered as a Republican. He left three credits short of graduation because he did not pass a math course; Schmidt has said that he has been diagnosed with a learning disability that makes higher math difficult for him. He joined the Delta Tau Delta fraternity, was a member of the campus Reserve Officers' Training Corps (ROTC) program, and did field work for Republican candidates in Delaware, sometimes wearing campaign buttons to class. Schmidt completed his final math course and received his degree in 2013.

Career

Early campaigns 
In 1995, Schmidt managed the unsuccessful campaign for Kentucky Attorney General of Will T. Scott, who is formerly a Justice of the Kentucky Supreme Court. This Kentucky campaign's advertising strategy was featured in the second edition of George Magazine.

In 1998, Schmidt ran California State Senator Tim Leslie's unsuccessful race for lieutenant governor of California. Also that year, he was the communications director for California State Treasurer Matt Fong's unsuccessful campaign to unseat U.S. Senator Barbara Boxer. In 1999, he was the communications director for Lamar Alexander's presidential run, leaving in June when the campaign reduced its senior staff.

Washington, D.C. 

By late 2000, Schmidt was communications director of the House Committee on Energy and Commerce.

In 2001, he was the spokesman of the National Republican Congressional Committee, becoming the Communications Director by 2002.

Schmidt joined the Bush administration as a deputy assistant to the president and counselor to Vice President Dick Cheney. In 2004, he was a member of the senior strategic planning group, led by White House adviser Karl Rove, that ran President George W. Bush's re-election campaign; Schmidt oversaw the reelection "war room". In 2005 and 2006, he was the White House strategist responsible for the U.S. Supreme Court nominations of Chief Justice John Roberts and justice Samuel Alito .

California 
In 2006, Schmidt left the White House to become the campaign manager of the successful re-election campaign for California Governor Arnold Schwarzenegger, following the firing of Mike Murphy, Rob Stutzman and Pat Clarey. Prior to Schmidt’s involvement, the governor’s approval rating was 39%. Schwarzenegger was considered "done" heading into the 2006 election, having lost four ballot measures in 2005. The media strategist for Schwarzenegger's opponent Phil Angelides said that Schmidt "was able to restore Arnold's original appeal." Countering a national anti-Republican wave, Schwarzenegger was re-elected with 57% of the vote in what was considered "a remarkable political turnaround."

From there, he became a partner in Mercury Public Affairs, part of FleishmanHillard, in charge of Mercury's operations in California.

In 2007, Schmidt was named "Campaign Manager of the Year" by the American Association of Political Consultants.

2008 McCain presidential campaign 

On July 2, 2008, Schmidt was appointed to head up day-to-day operations of the McCain campaign in response to concerns that the campaign lacked coordination and a clear message. Rick Davis retained the formal title of "campaign manager".

In 2022, Schmidt revealed he was deeply disillusioned with McCain by the end of the campaign and did not vote for him, and instead left his presidential vote blank.

Press commentary 
The New York Times described Schmidt's management as having transformed the McCain campaign into "an elbows-out, risk-taking, disciplined machine", crediting him with aggressive responses to press criticism and creative methods of manipulating the news cycle.

Time's Michael Scherer, in an opinion piece from September 15, 2008, relating to Schmidt's involvement with John McCain's presidential campaign, stated that Schmidt, the "lord of outrage, has a long and prosperous career ahead of him".

On September 22, 2008, Schmidt accused The New York Times of bias against McCain in favor of his opponent, Barack Obama, calling the Times "a pro-Obama advocacy organization that every day impugns the McCain campaign, attacks Senator McCain, attacks Governor (Sarah Palin)" and saying "Whatever The New York Times once was, it is today not by any standard a journalistic organization."

Stance on gay rights 
Schmidt voiced his support for gay rights at a meeting of the Log Cabin Republicans, a gay Republican group. He said: "I just wanted to take a second to come by and pay my respect and the campaign's respect to your organization and to your group. Your organization is an important one in the fabric of our party."

Schmidt said about his lesbian sister and her life partner: "On a personal level, my sister and her partner are an important part of my life and our children's life. I admire your group and your organization and I encourage you to keep fighting for what you believe in because the day is going to come."

In February 2013, Schmidt, along with 74 other Republicans, co-signed an amicus brief to the Supreme Court of the United States in support of overturning Proposition 8. "The die is cast on this issue when you look at the percentage of younger voters who support gay marriage", he was quoted as saying. "As Dick Cheney said years ago, 'Freedom means freedom for everybody.

While leading the 2008 John McCain presidential campaign, the McCain campaign states that "gay adoption is a state issue and does not endorse any federal legislation."

Departure from the Republican Party 
In May 2018, when President Donald Trump moved the U.S. embassy in Israel from Tel Aviv to Jerusalem, sparking violent Gaza border protests, Schmidt said Trump "has blood on his hands". The Embassy's opening coincided with the bloodiest day of the 2018 Gaza border protests, with more than 57 Palestinians killed. Despite initial violence after the decision, the United States under President Joe Biden has decided to keep the embassy in Jerusalem.

On June 19, 2018, Schmidt formally withdrew from the GOP over Trump's policy of separating immigrant families at the U.S. border with Mexico. He also cited Republican leadership for their failure to challenge the policy. Schmidt said of Trump, "We have in America—right now, at this hour—to understand that you have a lawless president, a vile president, a corrupt president, a mean, cruel president, who is seeking to remake the world order."

In June 2018, he tweeted: "the Republican Party ... is fully the party of Trump. It is corrupt, indecent and immoral. With the exception of a few Governors like Baker, Hogan and Kasich it is filled with feckless cowards who disgrace and dishonor the legacies of the party's greatest leaders ... Today the GOP has become a danger to our democracy and our values." During an August 2018 television appearance, he characterized Trumpism as follows:

Describing his new political orientation, he stated:

On December 14, 2020, Schmidt announced he was joining the Democratic Party on his podcast, Battleground.

Howard Schultz's possible 2020 run 
On January 28, 2019, it was reported that Schmidt, along with Democratic consultant Bill Burton, had been hired to help shape a potential presidential run by former Starbucks CEO Howard Schultz. After Schultz decided to withdraw from the race, Schmidt returned to MSNBC.

Other professional activities

Just Capital 
Schmidt serves on the board of the nonprofit research organization, Just Capital, alongside Arianna Huffington, Deepak Chopra, and others.

Words Matter Media 
In August 2018 Schmidt launched a podcast with Elise Jordan focused on the Trump presidency. Schmidt parted ways with the podcast when he walked out in the middle of an episode in which Jordan and executive producer Adam Levine questioned Schmidt about his role as adviser to potential 2020 presidential candidate Howard Schultz.

The Lincoln Project 
Schmidt is a founding member of The Lincoln Project, a Super PAC organized by former Republican operatives opposed to the re-election of Donald Trump in 2020, and supported the Democratic Presidential nominee Joe Biden. Schmidt and members of The Lincoln Project guest starred on Showtime's The Circus: Inside the Greatest Political Show on Earth in 2020, giving viewers an insight to their strategies.

In January 2020, a person working for the digital advertising company Tusk raised concerns about John Weaver's pattern of sexual harassment to Lincoln Project executive Ron Steslow, who in turn notified other Lincoln Project officials. By June 2020, members of The Lincoln Project's leadership were informed in writing and in subsequent phone calls of at least 10 specific allegations of harassment against John Weaver. Two of these allegations involved Lincoln Project employees.

Schmidt released a statement on January 31, 2021, "No Lincoln Project employee, intern, or contractors ever made an allegation of inappropriate communication about John Weaver that would have triggered an investigation by HR or by an outside employment counsel. In other words, no human being ever made an allegation about any inappropriate sexualized communications about John Weaver ever."

However, another former Lincoln Project employee told The New York Times that this was false, and Schmidt knew of the allegations in October 2020 "at the latest," and was present when Schmidt spoke about it. Other employees confirmed to the Times that Lincoln Project leadership was aware of the allegations even earlier than October.

In February 2021, Schmidt stepped down from his position on The Lincoln Project board and released a statement in which he disclosed he was sexually molested as a teen and apologized to another co-founder, Jennifer Horn, for tweeting her private correspondence with a reporter. He also stated he was stepping down from the board in order to make room for the appointment of a female board member as the first step to "reform and professionalize" The Lincoln Project.

Substack article 
In 2022, Schmidt established a Substack account entitled, The Warning. Using that platform, on May 8, 2022 he published the article, No Books. No Money. Just the Truth. In it, he discussed the 2008 campaign to elect John McCain and revealed that, after Schmidt and the campaign personnel had effectively overcome coverage of a reported affair with a lobbyist, McCain told him that the report was correct, and that Schmidt wanted to acknowledge his participation in "public lying".

In popular culture 
Schmidt was portrayed by Woody Harrelson in the 2012 HBO film Game Change. The film, based on chapters of the book of the same title by political journalists John Heilemann and Mark Halperin, focuses on the choice of Sarah Palin as John McCain's running mate in the 2008 United States presidential election. Schmidt is shown as pushing for the choice of Palin, then afterward conceding she was unqualified for the job, including that she had a limited knowledge of current affairs. Schmidt himself voiced his approval of the film, saying that "it tells the truth of the campaign" and that watching the film was tantamount to "an out-of-body experience".

Personal life 
Schmidt has three children with his former wife Angela Schmidt.

References

External links 

Romano, Lois (August 21, 2008) "The Silver Bullet: Steve Schmidt Makes Sure His Candidate Knows Exactly What He Is Shooting For". Washington Post
Steve Schmidt: Renowned Political Strategist and MSNBC Political Analyst. Speaker Bio at Leading Authorities. Retrieved March 30, 2018. 
Nagourney, Adam (July 3, 2008). "McCain Orders Shake-Up of His Campaign". The New York Times.

Living people
American campaign managers
American people of German descent
John McCain 2008 presidential campaign
American LGBT rights activists
New Jersey Republicans
Neoconservatism
North Plainfield High School alumni
People associated with the 2008 United States presidential election
People from North Plainfield, New Jersey
Criticism of Donald Trump
American political commentators
MSNBC people
Utah Independents
Utah Democrats
1970 births